The dogs of war is a phrase spoken by Mark Antony in Act 3, Scene 1, line 273 of English playwright William Shakespeare's Julius Caesar: "Cry 'Havoc!', and let slip the dogs of war."

Synopsis 

In the scene, Mark Antony is alone with Julius Caesar's body, shortly after Caesar's assassination.  In a soliloquy, he reveals his intention to incite the crowd at Caesar's funeral to rise up against the assassins.  Foreseeing violence throughout Rome, Antony even imagines Caesar's spirit joining in the exhortations: "raging for revenge, with Ate by his side come hot from hell, shall in these confines with a Monarch's voice cry 'Havoc!' and let slip the dogs of war."

Interpretation 

In a literal reading, "dogs" are the familiar animals, trained for warfare; "havoc" is a military order permitting the seizure of spoil after a victory and "let slip" is to release from the leash. Shakespeare's source for Julius Caesar was The Life of Marcus Brutus from Plutarch's Lives, and the concept of the war dog appears in that work, in the section devoted to the Greek warrior Aratus.

Apart from the literal meaning, a parallel can be drawn with the prologue to Henry V, where the warlike king is described as having at his heels, awaiting employment, like hounds "famine, sword and fire".

Along those lines, an alternative proposed meaning is that "the dogs of war" refers figuratively to the wild pack of soldiers "let slip" by war's breakdown of civilized behavior and/or their commanders' orders to wreak "havoc", i.e., rape, pillage, and plunder.

Based on the original meaning of "dog" in its mechanical sense ("any of various usually simple mechanical devices for holding, gripping, or fastening that consist of a spike, bar, or hook"), the "dogs" are "let slip" as an act of releasing. Thus, the "dogs of war" are the political and societal restraints against war that operate during times of peace.

In popular culture 

The phrase has entered so far into general usage that it is now regarded as a cliché.

Many books, films, video games, songs, and television episodes are titled using variations of the phrase “Dogs of War.”

Victor Hugo used "dogs of war" as a metaphor for cannon fire in chapter XIV of Les Misérables:

The phrase was used by Christopher Plummer's character General Chang in the film Star Trek VI: The Undiscovered Country, in a scene which featured Chang's Klingon Bird of Prey attacking the USS Enterprise.

Jeremy Clarkson used the phrase during a Top Gear special, before attempting a speed run at the Bonneville Salt Flats in a Chevrolet Corvette C6 ZR1, adding "They probably think that's a Bon Jovi lyric here."

Sterling Archer misquotes the phrase before embarking on a rampage to find the chemotherapy drugs for his aforementioned breast cancer.

Kevin Spacey on his role as Frank Underwood in the Series House of Cards used the phrase as he began a political attack to undermine the power of the President of the United States and move forward on his silent plan to take control of the White House and the executive power.

In 2017, it was used on a tifo at the King Power Stadium during the Champions League last 16 match featuring Leicester City and Sevilla FC. The tifo displayed a person holding onto dogs via a chain, with the phrase "Let Slip the Dogs of War" underneath.

The term “Dogs of War” is used in the boardgame Warhammer as a colloquial for various mercenary groups selling their swords for loot, plunder, and adventure.

The title of the 2000 PlayStation 1 game, Hogs of War (a turn based 3D tactics game with similarities to Worms, but with pigs of many national stereotypes) was a direct reference.

The Troy University Marching Band announcer reads the passage as part of the band's pregame show at every home football game.

See also 
 List of titles of works based on Shakespearean phrases § Julius Caesar

References

Bibliography 
 
  Note: The "Notes" for "Julius Cæsar" chapter in the Cornwall edition close with the signature "SINGER.", apparently referring to contributions based on the work of Samuel Weller Singer.

External links 
 

Julius Caesar (play)
Metaphors referring to dogs
Shakespearean phrases
16th-century neologisms